A Respectable Wedding is a short play by the German dramatist Bertolt Brecht. The German title Die Kleinbürgerhochzeit literally means the petit bourgeois wedding.

Like other of Brecht’s early works (Baal, Drums in the Night, and The Threepenny Opera), A Respectable Wedding is seen as a critique of bourgeois society.

The play includes nine characters: 
The Bride's Father
The Bridegroom's Mother
The Bride
The Bride's Sister
The Bridegroom
His Friend
The Wife
Her Husband
The Young Man

References

Plays by Bertolt Brecht